Margarochroma fuscalis is a moth in the family Crambidae. It was described by George Hampson in 1907. It is found on Sulawesi.

References

Acentropinae
Moths described in 1907
Taxa named by George Hampson